Telesforo or Telésforo is a masculine given name derived from Telesphorus. It may refer to:

 Telesforo Castillejos (born 1947), Filipino politician and former provincial governor
 Telésforo Isaac (born 1929), retired Episcopal bishop in the Dominican Republic
 Telesforo Monzón (1904–1981), Basque writer, politician and nationalist Basque leader
 Telésforo Pedraza Ortega (born 1945), Colombian politician, diplomat and lawyer
 Telésforo Santiago Enríquez (died 2019), Mexican radio journalist, professor and murder victim
 Telesforo Trinidad (1890–1968), United States Navy fireman awarded the Medal of Honor

Masculine given names